Apoglossum is a genus of red algae belonging to the family Delesseriaceae.

The genus has cosmopolitan distribution.

Species:

Apoglossum gregarium 
Apoglossum ruscifolium 
Apoglossum unguiculescens

References

Delesseriaceae
Red algae genera